Óscar Álvarez Sanjuán (born 9 June 1977) is a Spanish retired footballer who played as a central defender, currently assistant manager of UE Costa Brava.

Playing career
Born in Barcelona, Catalonia, Álvarez finished his youth career with local FC Barcelona, going on to feature for its C and B teams until the age of 22. He later signed with Real Oviedo, making his La Liga debut on 16 October 1999 by coming in as a late substitute in a 2–2 away draw against Real Madrid.

After playing for UE Lleida and CD Tenerife in the Segunda División, Álvarez joined Gimnàstic de Tarragona of the same league in July 2005. In his first and only season he contributed only 524 minutes in all competitions, but achieved promotion in the league.

Deemed surplus to requirements by Nàstic in the summer of 2006, and subsequently being left out of the first-team squad, Álvarez signed with Orihuela CF from Segunda División B in mid-January 2007. He returned to the second level nearly two years later with Girona FC but, after two seasons marked by injury, he moved back to division three with CE L'Hospitalet.

Álvarez signed for UE Llagostera also in his native region midway through the 2010–11 season, winning promotion from the Tercera División and going on to play several years with the club in the third tier.

Coaching career
Álvarez began working as a manager with his last team, as assistant to Oriol Alsina. He was promoted to head coach for the 2017–18 campaign, which ended in relegation from division three.

In September 2019, Álvarez accepted an offer from former Barcelona teammate Albert Celades to be part of his staff. Eleven months later, he returned to Llagostera still under Alsina.

Personal life
Álvarez's older brother, Quique, was also a footballer and a stopper, who represented mainly Villarreal CF. Their father Quique Costas occupied the same position, and played professionally for RC Celta de Vigo, Barcelona and the Spanish national team.

References

External links

1977 births
Living people
Spanish people of Galician descent
Spanish footballers
Footballers from Barcelona
Association football defenders
La Liga players
Segunda División players
Segunda División B players
Tercera División players
FC Barcelona C players
FC Barcelona Atlètic players
Real Oviedo players
UE Lleida players
CD Tenerife players
Gimnàstic de Tarragona footballers
Orihuela CF players
Girona FC players
CE L'Hospitalet players
UE Costa Brava players
Spanish football managers
Segunda División B managers
UE Costa Brava managers
Valencia CF non-playing staff